Frank K. "Bunny" Hare (June 28, 1885 – 1961) was an American football and minor league baseball player. He was also a college football coach.

Indiana University
Hare was a quarterback for the Indiana University football team from 1903 to 1906.

Minor League Baseball
Hare played 19 games for the Sioux City Packers of the Western League in 1907.

College coaching
Hare served as the head football coach at the Rose Polytechnic Institute in Terre Haute, Indiana in 1907..

References

External links

 

1885 births
1961 deaths
Indiana University alumni
American football quarterbacks
Indiana Hoosiers football players
Sioux City Packers players
Rose–Hulman Fightin' Engineers football coaches
People from Noblesville, Indiana
Players of American football from Indiana